Niloofar is an Iranian drama film written and directed by Lebanese filmmaker Sabine El Gemayel. It is an international co-production between the French company Pyramide Films and companies in Lebanon and Iran. The film was released in 2008 and screened at the AFI Fest in Los Angeles that year.

The story focuses on a young girl just entering puberty. This new phase in her life marks her entry into the circle of women, which brings with it new cultural obligations that leave little room for her own personal quest.

Niloofar won the Best Feature Film and Best Actress award at the 2009 Noor Iranian Film Festival in Los Angeles.

Synopsis 
Niloofar, a twelve-year-old Iraqi girl, dreams of being able to read and write. Unfortunately, in her village only boys can go to school. Niloofar's mother, a midwife, pushes her to become her apprentice. During one of the deliveries, Niloofar meets an educated woman. In secret, she starts to teach Niloofar how to read and write.

In the meantime, Niloofar's father has bought a field of palms. The price: Niloofar, as soon as she is a woman. Niloofar is horrified by this and tries to postpone her periods. When her periods finally do arrive, she hides this from the community. But the truth cannot be hidden for long and one day her secret is exposed. Terrified Niloo must obey her father's word and marry a man who once had his own daughter put to death for loving a boy. This boy was Niloo's uncle, Aziz. Aziz, haunted by the memory of the young lover he lost years before, feels compelled to help Niloo avert a similar destiny. Aziz devises a plan to help Niloo escape and the two set off together. Niloo's family is furious when they discover she is missing and vow to bring her back to face retribution for dishonoring the family. They send her stepbrother out to track Niloofar down and bring her back.

Cast 
 Roya Nonahali as Salmah
 Mobina Aynehdar as Niloofar
 Nayereh Farahani as Noor
 Shahab Hosseini as Aziz
 Hengameh Ghaziani as Firoozeh
 Tooraj Faramarzian as Uncle Akbar
 Sadegh Safaie as Abdollah
 Fatemeh Motamed Aria as Banoo
 Alireza Ziaijan as Said
 Miald Shirmohamadi as Amir
 Saghar Slolaymani as Zeinab
 Amir Aghaei as Sheik Abbas

Production

Development 
Writer and director Sabine El Gemayel based the script's story on a girl she met in Lebanon who was facing the prospect of an arranged marriage. Gemayel commented, however, that the issues raised in the film are not specific to one culture, saying, "It’s a humanist film that’s critical of a specific tradition, not a culture ... I did not want to make a film that was anti-Arab.”

Filming 
Niloofar was filmed in Iran in 2007 over a 53-day shoot.

Critical reception 
The film received critical acclaim. In a positive review of a screening at the AFI Fest, the AP said, "writer-director Sabine El Gemayel evinces a poetic eye for the colors and textures of domestic life" and the film "is direct and elliptical, contemporary and timeless".

Robert Koehler of Variety was more critical, writing the film is "a wobbly variation on the familiar theme of tradition-bound girls growing up in the 21st century".

Festivals 
 Montréal World Film Festival
 AFI Fest
 Berlin International Film Festival
 Zlín International Film Festival for Children and Youth
 Rehoboth Beach Independent Film Festival
 Noor Iranian Film Festival - Winner - Best Feature and Best Actress for Roya Nonahali

References

External links 
 Niloofar at Tadrart Films. Archived from the original on 01-09-2013.
 Niloofar at Pars Times
 

2008 directorial debut films
2008 films
2000s feminist films
2000s French films
Arranged marriage in fiction
French drama films
Iranian drama films
Fictional child brides and grooms
Films about honor killing
Films about puberty
Films set in Iraq
Films shot in Iran
Lebanese drama films